Galleria Retail Technology Solutions, also referred to as Galleria or Galleria-rts, was a software company based in Staffordshire, United Kingdom with operations in the United States based in Dublin-Pleasanton, California and Chicago, Illinois.

The company was founded in 1989 by a group of investors including Jef Richards and Robin Teesdale. The company name was inspired by the Galleria Vittorio Emanuele II in Milan, Italy. It was acquired by RELEX Solutions of Helsinki, Finland in 2016.

Services
The company develops merchandising software used by retailers and manufacturers to optimise product sales by sorting through inventory and sales data and determines a product category's performance at the store and regional level, with software modules for data storage, promotional display planning, buying pattern analysis and space planning.

Galleria clients are primarily in the grocery business, although M.video hired the company in September 2011 to determine space and assortment requirements for its consumer electronics store chain in Russia.

Clients include United Kingdom grocery retailer Morrisons, One Stop, a leading convenience store chain in the United Kingdom owned by Tesco, and U.S. grocery chain The Great Atlantic & Pacific Tea Company (A&P).

References

External links
Official Website
OKRs FAQ Webpage
Yo WhatsApp Download
Channel Software Tech Stack
http://www.drugstorenews.com/article/ap-turns-technology-provider-galleria-optimize-merchandising-strategy
http://www.chainstoreage.com/article/survey-empty-shelves-long-checkout-lines-among-top-threats-keeping-customers

Software companies of the United Kingdom
Companies based in Staffordshire
Companies established in 1989